This is a list of countries by population in 1900, with colonial possessions being counted towards the ruling country's total  (such as Poland counting towards Russia and Cuba counting as part of the United States).

Estimate numbers are from the beginning of the year and exact population figures are for countries that held a census on various dates in the year 1900.

Map

List

Notes

References

 
 
 
 

Pop
1900

te:దేశాల జాబితా – 1907 జనసంఖ్య క్రమంలో